Markus Kägi (born 8 May 1960) is a Swiss luger. He competed in the men's singles event at the 1980 Winter Olympics.

References

1960 births
Living people
Swiss male lugers
Olympic lugers of Switzerland
Lugers at the 1980 Winter Olympics
Place of birth missing (living people)